Ba is a province of Fiji, occupying the north-western sector of Viti Levu, Fiji's largest island. It is one of fourteen provinces in the nation of Fiji, and one of eight based in Viti Levu. It is Fiji's most populous province, with a population of 247,708 - more than a quarter of the nation's total - at the 2017 census.

Ba Province includes the towns and districts of Ba, Magodro, Nadi, Nawaka, Tavua, Vuda and Vitogo.  The city of Lautoka and the Yasawa Archipelago, off the western coast of Viti Levu, are also in Ba Province.

Notable residents of Ba Province include Fiji's former president, Ratu Josefa Iloilo and the former Chairman of the Great Council of Chiefs, Ratu Ovini Bokini.  Former prime ministers Timoci Bavadra and Mahendra Chaudhry, both of whom were deposed in coups and Ratu Tevita Momoedonu, were also from Ba Province.

Vuda Point, in Ba Province, is the traditional landing of the canoes that brought the Melanesian ancestors of the Fijian people to the islands.  The nearby village of Viseisei (President Iloilo's hometown) is traditionally considered to be the oldest in Fiji.

The province is governed by a Provincial Council, which is chaired by Ratu Tevita Momoedonu.

References 

 
Provinces of Fiji
Ba